The 2021 European Championship D was an international rugby league tournament. Originally scheduled to take place in October and November 2020 the championship was postponed until 2021 due to the COVID-19 pandemic following a meeting of the European Rugby League (ERL) in July 2020. Four teams competed in the tournament; Czechia, Malta, Netherlands and Turkey.

The tournament was won by the Netherlands who beat Czechia 36–10 in the final.

Background
After initially being re-scheduled following the COVID-19 pandemic, the tournament was planned to be played to be played in May and June 2021 with the teams being drawn into two groups of two. The groups would play two games, one home and one away; with the aggregate winners of the two groups meeting in a final. In April 2021 the Rugby League European Federation announced that the tournament will be played at a single venue and that the format of the tournament will not be as originally announced.

The revised draw, venue and format were announced on 1 September 2021. The games were all staged in Bodrum, Turkey on 14 and 17 October and was a single-leg knock-out tournament. To give each team two matches, the losers of the first round games met in a third-place game.

The winner of this tournament will be promoted to the 2023 European Championship B as well as progressing to the qualifying tournament for the 2025 Rugby League World Cup.

Participants

Squads
On 13 October 2021, each competing nation announced 19-man squads for the tournament.

Czech Republic

Antonín Berk, Daniel Veselý, Filip-Daniel Kittl, (Krupka Dragons), David Bělohlávek, Jan Říha, Erik Schulz (Slávia Hradec Králové), Jakub Hudrlík, Jan Hovard, Josef Chuchlík, Martin Kubát, Matěj Greenwood, Taras Turkevyč, Tomáš Horák (Mad Squirrels Vrchlabí), Jiří Pecina, Ondřej Preininger, Tomáš Řičica (Chrudim Rabbitohs), Jan Pecháček (Vlci Trutnov), Roman Richtr (Barbarians Letohrad), Tomáš Kasík (Black Angels Hodonín)

Malta

Alfie Jewitt (Ackworth Jaguars), Justin Barlogio (DC Slayers), Dean Zammit (Hunslet), Christian Briffa, Mark Camilleri, Shaun Chircop, Jeremy Dela, Aidan Demicoli, Shan Francois Hussain (IKHAL), Cameron Brown, Russell Bugeja, Robin Cutajar, Justin Farrugia, James Grech, Jean Scholey, Jean Pierre Zarb, Luke Musu (ISWED), Zarrin Galea (Redcliffe Dolphins), Karl Cassar (Shaw Cross Sharks)

Netherlands

Adam Braksator, Bonne Wilce, Frank Longhurst, Lucas Gout, Maurits Thomson, Paul Dirkzwager, Romeo Goldman, Thomas Farrell (Den Haag Knights), Arie-Tjerk Razoux Schultz, Daniel de Ruiter, (Haderwijk Dolphins), Auke Idzerda, Ben Dommershuijsen, Edson Neves, Isaac Ngirubiu, Shadan Lavia (Rotterdam  Pitbulls), Joran Schoenmaker, Laury Renac, Mauricio Gomez Pazos, Paul Kuijpers (Zwolle Wolves)

Turkey

Alperen Kademli, Can Günersu, Erdem Çağdaş, Kemal Ege Gürkan (Ankara Frigler), Mert Tayyar Berktav (Bilgi Badgers), Miraç Ertürk, Ahmet Tarik Tekin, Batuhan Balçin, Doruk Çeliktutan, Oğuzhan Demir, Ozan Işik, Rama Kabak, Taner Burak, Yusuf Can Tunç (Kadiköy Bulls), Selçuk Cömert (Kandira Ragbi), Errol Carter (London Skolars), Behzad Bayram (Rg Heidelberg), Oğuzhan Tirendez, Ömer Faruk Pir (Trakya Ragbi)

Bracket

Fixtures

Semi-finals

Play-offs

References 

European rugby league competitions
2021 in rugby league
Rugby League European Championship D